Shamit Kachru (born 1970) is a theoretical physicist, a professor of physics at Stanford University, and the Wells Family Director of the Stanford Institute for Theoretical Physics.  He served as the Stanford Physics Department Chair from 2018 to 2021.

Career
Kachru's research has explored a broad range of topics in string theory and quantum field theory, and their applications in cosmology, condensed matter physics, and elementary particle theory. He has made central contributions to the study of compactifications of string theory from ten to four dimensions, especially in the investigation of mechanisms which could yield string models of dark energy or cosmic inflation.  He has also made notable contributions to the discovery and exploration of string dualities, to the study of models of supersymmetry breaking in string theory, and to the construction of calculable dual descriptions of strongly coupled particle physics and condensed matter systems. More recently, his work has focused on connections between geometry, number theory, and string theory. His research has also moved into theoretical questions in evolutionary biology and ecology.

Kachru is a recipient of a Department of Energy Outstanding Junior Investigator Award, an Alfred P. Sloan Foundation Fellowship, the Bergmann Memorial Award, a David and Lucile Packard Foundation Fellowship, and a Simons Investigator Award.  He was elected as a Member of the American Academy of Arts and Sciences in 2022.

In 1986, Kachru attended the prestigious Research Science Institute. He graduated from University High School in Urbana, Illinois and from Harvard University before obtaining a doctorate in physics from Princeton University under the supervision of Edward Witten. Kachru was a Junior Fellow in the Harvard Society of Fellows. In 2017 he received a Simons Investigator Award.

Kachru is best known for his extensive research on flux compactifications (including work with Steve Giddings and Joseph Polchinski), which can stabilize the extra dimensions of string theory. In collaboration with Renata Kallosh, Andrei Linde, and Sandip Trivedi, he found the first models of accelerated expansion of the universe in low energy supersymmetric string compactifications (see KKLT mechanism). He made notable contributions to string theory duality (with Cumrun Vafa), the AdS/CFT correspondence (with Eva Silverstein), and to the construction of models of cosmic inflation. He has also done significant work on the holographic description of finite density quantum matter, the theory of non-Fermi liquids, and the understanding of moonshine and its connections to physics and geometry.

He is the son of Braj Kachru and Yamuna Kachru, and is married to fellow Stanford professor Eva Silverstein.

References

External links
 Faculty page at Stanford University 

21st-century American physicists
American people of Indian descent
American people of Kashmiri descent
American Hindus
Kashmiri people
Kashmiri Pandits
American string theorists
Harvard University alumni
Princeton University alumni
Rutgers University people
Harvard Fellows
Stanford University Department of Physics faculty
1970 births
Living people
Theoretical physicists
Simons Investigator
University Laboratory High School (Urbana, Illinois) alumni